Lae Snax Tigers is a rugby league club based in Lae, Papua New Guinea. The club was established in 2011

Lae Snax Tigers competes in Papua New Guinea Semi Professional rugby league competition called the Digicel Cup (PNG NRL). The team has captured the prestigious championship title a total of four times over its short history of being involved since 2013, making the Tigers the fastest rising rugby league club in PNG sports.

They have also competed in the Melanesian Cup match, a traditional match up between the Semi Professional champions from both PNG and Fiji respective competitions. Lae Snax Tigers making three appearances and claiming the Melanesian Cup trophy from all three matches.

2022 squad

Honours

League
PNGNRL Digicel Cup
Winners (4): 2016, 2017, 2019, 2021,
Runners up (1): 2020,

References

Papua New Guinean rugby league teams
Lae
2013 establishments in Papua New Guinea
Rugby clubs established in 2013